The Mausoleum of Maxentius was part of a large complex on the Appian Way in Rome that included a palace and a chariot racing circus, constructed by the Emperor Maxentius. The large circular tomb was built by Maxentius in the early 4th century, probably with himself in mind and as a family tomb, but when his young son  Valerius Romulus died he was buried there. After extensive renovation the mausoleum was reopened to the public in 2014.

History
Maxentius may have decided to build the mausoleum on the Appian Way because, according to Roman custom, all bodies had to be buried outside the city. The complex is very close to several catacombs.  The mausoleum is believed to have been a two-story, cylindrical rotunda with a diameter of around 35 metres, but only its semi-underground floor survives. There is a central octagonal pillar with a diameter of more than nine meters and this is circled by a seven-meter-wide, vaulted corridor with open niches for the sarcophagi.
 There is no trace of floor or wall decoration, suggesting that the building was never completed.

An 18th century home largely obscures the mausoleum from the Appian Way and stands where a columnar porch once framed the tomb's principal entrance. This was originally a farmhouse and was later converted into a home by the Torlonia family, who owned it until it was taken over by the Fascist government in 1943.

See also
List of ancient monuments in Rome

References

External links
 

Roman emperors' mausoleums
Mausoleums in Rome